R.I.P. is a live album by the American punk rock band Rocket from the Crypt, released on February 26, 2008, by Vagrant Records. It is a recording of the band's final performance on October 31, 2005, at the Westin Hotel Ballroom in San Diego. It also includes a DVD of the entire performance, including several songs not included on the CD.

Track listing

Personnel
Speedo (John Reis) – guitar, lead vocals
ND (Andy Stamets) – guitar, backing vocals
Petey X (Pete Reichert) – bass, backing vocals
Apollo 9 (Paul O'Beirne) - saxophone, percussion, backing vocals
JC 2000 (Jason Crane) - trumpet, percussion, backing vocals
Ruby Mars (Mario Rubalcaba) – drums

References

Rocket from the Crypt albums
2008 live albums
2008 video albums
Live video albums